The Flinders state by-election, 1901 was a by-election held on 8 June 1901 for the South Australian House of Assembly seat of Flinders.

Results

The by-election was triggered by the election of Flinders MHA Alexander Poynton to the inaugural Australian House of Representatives at the 1901 federal election. It was won by former Flinders MHA William Tennant Mortlock, who had been unexpectedly defeated at the 1899 general election, defeating future MHA Arthur Hugh Inkster.

See also
List of South Australian state by-elections

References

South Australian state by-elections
1901 elections in Australia
1900s in South Australia